Alhadeff is a Jewish Sephardic surname of Arabic (from the verb هَدَى (hadā) "to guide" preceded by the article اَل (al-) "the", thus literally "the guided"; cf. Huda) and then Spanish-Moorish origin which is found most often among the Eastern Sephardim who left Spain before 1492 to settle in the Eastern Mediterranean region, especially on the Greek island of Rhodes.
Variations of this surname include Alhadef and Alhadahef.

People
Brian Asher Alhadeff, American conductor
Cara Judea Alhadeff, American photographer and performance artist
Lori Alhadeff, American activist

References

External links

Sephardic surnames
Surnames from nicknames